Rudersdal Municipality (Danish: Rudersdal Kommune) is a part suburban, part rural municipality (Danish, kommune) located on the northern outskirts of Copenhagen, Denmark. It covers an area of 73 km² and has a population of 57,247 (1. January 2022). The distance from Copenhagen City Hall Square is approximately 20 km. The western part of the municipality is served by the Hillerød radial of the S-train network while the eastern part is served by the Coast Line. Administratively Rudersdal Municipality belongs to Region Hovedstaden.

On 1 January 2007 Rudersdal municipality was created as the result of 2007 Danish Municipal Reform, consisting of the former municipalities of Søllerød and Birkerød. 

Its mayor  is Ann Sofie Orth. She is a member of the Conservative Party political party. Rudersdal Town Hall (formerly Søllerød Town Hall), completed in 1942, was designed by Arne Jacobsen and Flemming Lassen.

History
Birkerød Municipality was a municipality  in Frederiksborg County, and Søllerød Municipality was a municipality in Copenhagen County, both on the island of Zealand (Sjælland) in eastern Denmark.  the two municipalities ceased to exist as they were merged to form Rudersdal Municipality. It merged with Søllerød Municipality to form the new Rudersdal municipality. The new municipality belongs to the new Region Hovedstaden ("Capital Region").

Demography
As of 1 January 2015, 19,681 residents lived in neighbourhoods such as Holte and Søllerød that are part of Copenhagen's urban area, 20,191 lived in Birkerød, 12,491 lived in Hørsholm, 1,222 residents lived in Skodsborg, 606 residents lived in Ravnsnæs, 326 residents lived in Høsterkøb and 810 residents lived in rural zones.

Locations

Transport

Rail 
Birkerød and Holte stations are located on the Hillerød radial of the S-train network. Both are served by the A trains and Holte station is also served by the E trains.

Skodsborg and Vedbæk stations are located on the Coast Line between Copenhagen and Helsingør. The line is served by the Øresundståg trains.

The Nærum Line links Nærum with Jægersborg station on the S-train network.

Roads
Major roads include Lyngby Kongevej and the Helsingør Motorway.

Cycling and walking
KulturSlangen  is a 14.5 km, signposted greenway which runs from Næsseslottet in Holte in the west to Vedbæk Marina on the Øresund Coast in the east. It was established in 1996 and passes various points of interest. A number of smaller round trails extends from the route. The Vedbæk Circuit (Danish: Vedbækturen) was inaugurated on 22 November 2015.

Rudersdal Municipality will be served by the under development network of Super Bikeways in metropolitan Copenhagen. Bike lanes are already available on Lyngby Kongevej and many other roads.

Politics

Municipal council
Rudersdal's municipal council consists of 23 members, elected every four years.

Below are the municipal councils elected since the Municipal Reform of 2007.

Twin towns – sister cities
Rudersdal is twinned with four cities:

References 
 
 Municipal statistics: NetBorger Kommunefakta, delivered from KMD aka Kommunedata (Municipal Data)
 Municipal mergers and neighbors: Eniro new municipalities map

External links

 Official home page

 
Municipalities in the Capital Region of Denmark
Municipalities of Denmark
Copenhagen metropolitan area
Populated places established in 2007